The IHF Congress is the supreme legislative body of the International Handball Federation (French: Fédération Internationale de Handball), commonly known by the acronym IHF. IHF is the international governing body of handball, beach handball and wheelchair handball.

The congress may be ordinary or extraordinary. Ordinary congress shall place every two years (odd years) after the IHF World Men's Handball Championship. Each congress shall determine the date and place of the following ordinary congress. IHF bodies including the President, IHF Council and IHF Executive Committee shall be elected every four years at the congress taking place the year after the Summer Olympic Games. 

Each of the 204 members of IHF has one vote in the congress. The members of IHF can propose candidates for the presidency of IHF and for IHF Council. The IHF Presidential election takes place at the congress in the year following the Summer Olympic Games.

The extraordinary congress shall be convened by the IHF Council upon the written request of a simple majority of the member federations or Council members. Extraordinary congress must be convened within three months of the receipt of the request.

History
The IHF congress has been held since 1946. Before 31st Ordinary Congress 2007 in Madrid (Spain), the congresses were held in the even years.

IHF Presidential elections have taken place at every congress until the 14th IHF Congress 1972 in Nuremberg, West Germany, where the delegates decided to vote the elections to be held every four years in the Olympic rhythm.

List of congresses

Presidential elections
Following table shows the results of election of the President of International Handball Federation in recent decades.

References

External links
IHF Congress

International Handball Federation
International conferences